SS Calder was a freight vessel built for the Goole Steam Shipping Company in 1887.

History

In 1905 she was acquired by the Lancashire and Yorkshire Railway. In 1922 she was acquired by the London and North Western Railway. In 1923 she was acquired by the London, Midland and Scottish Railway.

She was sent for scrapping on 23 April 1926.

References

1887 ships
Steamships of the United Kingdom
Ships built on the River Tyne
Ships of the Lancashire and Yorkshire Railway
Ships of the London and North Western Railway
Ships of the London, Midland and Scottish Railway